Euxoa clausa is a moth of the family Noctuidae first described by James Halliday McDunnough in 1923. It is known in North America mainly from the north-western Great Plains in southern Saskatchewan and Alberta, south to south-western Montana and Nebraska.

The wingspan is about 33 mm. Adults are on wing in July to August. There is one generation per year.

References

Euxoa
Moths of North America
Moths described in 1923